Joshua Sieger  (5 January 1907 – 1 March 1993) was an English scientist and engineer.

The founder of the gas detection brand J&S Sieger (known today as Honeywell Analytics), was not only the father of modern gas detection but a pioneer of diverse communications technologies. He impacted on a variety of industries, helping to catalyze technological advancement in a number of fields including television, radar and gas detection.

Footnotes

http://www.purbeckradar.org.uk/people/list-by-group.htm

http://www.proz.com/kudoz/german_to_english/engineering:_industrial/2194856-siegerkopf.html

1907 births
1993 deaths
Commanders of the Order of the British Empire
People from Shepherd's Bush
20th-century British engineers